Turquoise is a 2009 Belgian-Turkish drama film written and directed by Kadir Balcı about the identity crisis experienced by three Turkish brothers who return to the Belgian city of Ghent after they bury their father in Istanbul.

Production
The film was shot on location in Istanbul, Turkey and Ghent, Belgium.

Release

General release 

Festival screenings 
 16th London Turkish Film Festival (4–18 November 2010)

See also
 2010 in film
 Turkish films of 2010

References

External links
 
 

2009 films
Belgian drama films
Turkish drama films
Films shot in Turkey
2009 drama films